Age of Dinosaurs is a 2013 low budget science fiction action film directed by Joseph J. Lawson and starring Ronny Cox and Treat Williams.

Plot
Using flesh-regeneration machines, Genetisharp (a biotech company) creates a set of living dinosaurs and pterosaurs from a strand of DNA. The creatures escape and terrorize Los Angeles. These prehistoric animals include a giant Ceratosaurus, raptorlike Carnotaurus, building-climbing Spinosaurus, and brutal Pteranodon. The final battle is on the Hollywood Sign, and the dinosaurs are all destroyed when they are run into a collapsing building due to them being drawn there by scent.

Cast
 Treat Williams as Gabe Jacobs
 Ronny Cox as Justin
 Jillian Rose Reed as Jade Jacobs
 Joshua Michael Allen as Craig Carson
 Max Aria as Leo Karst
 Johannes Goetz as Hans
 Julia Paul as Leanna
 Arthur Richardson as Sergeant Mike
 Jose Rosete as Doug
 Laura Tuny as Kim Evans
 Roani Whent as Nile
 Jodi Lyn Brockton as Vanessa
 Kelly V. Dolan as Technician Rosario
 Jennifer Robyn Jacobs as Technician Graham
 Andray Johnson as Police Chief Dawson
 Roger Lim as Lieutenant Crawford
 Ben Anklam as SWAT Leader (Benjamin James)

References

External links

2013 films
Films about dinosaurs
2010s science fiction adventure films
2013 science fiction action films
The Asylum films
American science fiction adventure films
American science fiction action films
American disaster films
Giant monster films
American monster movies
2010s monster movies
Films set in Los Angeles
2010s English-language films
2010s American films